Epicharis is the name of two Christian martyrs.

250
Her feast day is 9 January (the day of her martyrdom) in the Roman Catholic Church.

Born in Africa, she was martyred in 250 with Felix, Jucundus, Secundus, Vitalis, and seven other companions. An Epictetus, a bishop, was recorded by St. Cyprian.

300
Said to be the wife of a Roman senator, she was martyred in Byzantium or Asia Minor in 300.  Her feast day is September 27 in the Eastern Orthodox and Roman Catholic churches.

Some sources give her as a lady of a senatorial family, who was scourged and then smitten with the sword in Rome in the persecution of Diocletian.

References

300 deaths
250 deaths
3rd-century Christian martyrs
Year of birth unknown